Pathways is an American progressive metalcore band from Seattle, Washington. The group was signed to Tragic Hero Records and released their EP, "Dies Irae" (2016) through the label. In 2021, they released a new single, "Great Old Ones"

The band is known for their use of dual 8 string guitars and strong classical influences.

Discography

EPs

Singles

Music Video

Members

Current members
 Jon Rose - guitar (2012–present)
 Caner Gökeri - vocals (2020–present)
 Wil Lanagan - drums (2015–present)
 Kyle Miller - bass (2020–present)

Former members
 Nicholas Scott - scream vocals (2014–2017)
 Lorence Drewry - bass (2014–2017)
 Lee Metzger - drums (2012–2016)
 Jentzen Flaskerud - guitar, bass (2012–2020)

References

American progressive metal musical groups
Tragic Hero Records artists
Musical groups from Fort Lauderdale, Florida
2012 establishments in Florida
Musical groups established in 2012